P. Venu (8 November 1940 – 25 May 2011), was an Indian film director, producer, screenwriter, and lyricist with over 20 films to his name.His directorial venture Udhyogastha in 1967 was the first-ever multi-star cast film of the south India. His work in Malayalam cinema was significant and most influential, covering all themes and genres over a career spanning more than 40 years. His most recognized film C.I.D. Nazir, in 1971, revolutionized movie-making in the investigative genre in Malayalam cinema. Following this film's commercial and critical success, he came up with two more in the series - Taxi Car in 1972 and Prethangalude Thazhvara in 1973, as the first investigative sequels in Malayalam cinema. His last film, Parinamam (The Change), in 2003 won an honour for the Malayalam cinema on the global stage by winning the Best Screenplay Award at the Ashdod International Film Festival in Israel. In 2005 he was bestowed with the Kala Prathiba (Icon of Creative Arts), by the Kerala Film Critics Association for his immense contribution to Malayalam cinema. He was also an active member of MACTA (Malayalam Cine Technicians Association). He published his book titled Udyogastha Muthal (meaning ‘Udyogastha Onwards’) in 2010, reminiscing his life as a filmmaker and his experiences in the film industry.

Early life

Early life
Venu was born in Purannatukara, Thrissur district, Kerala, he was the son of Madhava Kurup and Amminiamma. His fascination and passion for filmmaking led him to Merryland Studio, Trivandrum, Kerala, where he worked as an assistant director for a few years before making his directorial debut Udhyogastha in 1967.

Personal life

In 1972, Venu married Sasekala from Parithipulli in Palakkad district, Kerala. Their son Vijay Menon is a writer, filmmaker, and founder of THE, a branding and design agency based in chennai. Their daughter Sridevi was a professor at Ethiraj College for Women, Chennai, presently settled with her husband in Canada.

Career

Venu made his debut as a filmmaker with Udhyogastha in 1967, the first multi-superstar cast Malayalam film starring Prem Nazir, Satyan, Madhu, K. P. Ummer, Sharada and Vijaya Nirmala. It was also the debut film of the National award winner Shoba as a child artist. She was named 'Baby Shoba' by Venu. He followed this commercial success with family dramas Virunnukari and Veettu Mrugam, both in 1969. His versatility was widely acclaimed when he directed the first full-length comedy Viruthan Shanku in 1968, starring the legendary comedian Adoor Bhasi. His works covered different themes and genres, earning him much regard as one of the veteran film directors of south India. He revolutionized Malayalam movie-making in the investigative genre in 1971 with C.I.D. Nazir, followed by Taxi Car in 1972 and Prethangalude Thazhvara in 1973. The first-ever investigative sequel made in Malayalam cinema history. His collaboration with the then superstar action hero Jayan created the iconic action scene in Ariyappedatha Rahasyam in 1981. Apart from a strong storyline, action, and drama, his movies were also famous for songs. Few of the compositions like Anuraga Ganam Pole (Udhyogastha), Ezhuthiyatharanu Sujatha (Udhyogastha), Ninmamiarayile (CID Nazir), Neela Nishidhini (C.I.D. Nazir), Malayala Bashathan (Prethangalude Thazhvazha) have become evergreen hits of Malayalam cinema. Music in his movies was composed by legendary music directors like M.S. Baburaj (Baburaj), G. Devarajan, K. Raghavan, R. K. Shekhar, M. K. Arjunan, Raveendran and Johnson. He worked with the leading actors, musicians, cinematographers, production houses for over four decades. He also debuted the careers of many of today’s top film and entertainment personalities in the industry.

Parinamam (The Change)

Parinamam (The Change), an NFDC film released in 2003 directed by Venu, tackles the age-old issue of loneliness and redundancy among the aged. Balakrishna Marar played by Madampu Kunjukuttan, faces callous treatment from his family after his retirement. Parallel to his story is that of the mentally disturbed and lonely former judge Damodaran Nambeeshan played by Nedumudi Venu, who goes to Kashi searching for peace. There are five other senior citizens whose problems form the basis of the film. The story revolves around the lives of these characters, who lose everything they hold dear, feel rejected, and develop a feeling of being a burden on their respective families and society. In 2003 the film was screened at the Malayalam Film Festival, Dubai, Chennai International Film Festival, and the Indian Panorama section of the International Film Festival of India. The film won a selection at Cannes 2004. In 2005, the film won the award for Best Screenplay at the Ashdod International Film Festival held in Israel.

Filmography

Udhyogastha - 1967
Viruthan Shanku - 1968
Virunnukari - 1969
Veettu Mrugam - 1969
Detective 909 Keralathil - 1970
C.I.D. Nazir - 1971
Taxi Car - 1972
Prethangalude Thazhvara - 1973
Boy Friend - 1975
Cherupakkar Sukshikuga - 1976
Raathriyile Yaathrakkaar - 1976
Aalmaaraattam - 1978
Amrutha Chumbanam - 1979
Avalude Prathikaram - 1979
Ward No.7 - 1979
Pichathikuttappan - 1979
Ariyappedatha Rahasyam - 1981
Aranjaanam - 1982
Thacholi Thankappan - 1984
Shesham Screenil - 1990
Parassala Pachan Payyannur Paramu - 1999 
Parinamam (The Change) - 2003

Published

References

External links

Further reading

 

Malayali people
1940 births
2011 deaths
Malayalam screenwriters
Film directors from Thrissur
Malayalam film directors
Telugu film directors
Tamil film directors
Odia film directors
Hindi-language film directors
Writers from Thrissur
Indian documentary filmmakers
20th-century Indian film directors
21st-century Indian film directors
20th-century Indian dramatists and playwrights
Film producers from Thrissur
Malayalam film producers
Screenwriters from Kerala